Jonathan Figueroa (born April 26, 1982), better known by his ring name Amazing Red, is a Puerto Rican professional wrestler and promoter. He is best known for working for Total Nonstop Action Wrestling (TNA), where he is a former three-time X Division Champion and one-time NWA World Tag Team Champion. He has worked on the American independent circuit and appeared for Ring of Honor (ROH) and Combat Zone Wrestling (CZW). Figueroa is also the founder of House of Glory wrestling school, where he is also one of the head trainers. He is the cousin of wrestlers Joel and Jose Maximo and Zelina Vega.

In April 2019, Red announced his retirement from professional wrestling due to a severe neck injury. However, he would return to the ring only a few months later, to work for New Japan Pro-Wrestling (NJPW).

Professional wrestling career

International Wrestling Association (1998–2002)
Figueroa originally wrestled as Red, but Savio Vega decided to expand his ring name to include the word "Amazing" while he worked for the International Wrestling Association in Puerto Rico, giving origin to his more common pseudonym, Amazing Red.

NWA Total Nonstop Action (2002–2004)
Red, who was already known for his work in the United States independent circuit, joined Total Nonstop Action Wrestling (TNA) at its 2002 inception, quickly establishing himself in its X Division. During his first run in TNA, Red held both the TNA X Division Championship and the NWA World Tag Team Championship with Jerry Lynn, simultaneously. At Victory Road, Red competed in a 20-man X-Division Gauntlet match for the X Division Cup which was won by Héctor Garza.

Ring of Honor (2002–2003)
While working for TNA, he also wrestled for Ring of Honor as a member of the three-man tag team The S.A.T. with cousins, Jose and Joel Maximo. Eventually, he began to team with "The Phenomenal" A.J. Styles, becoming known together as Amazing Phenomenon. The team would go on to win the ROH Tag Team Championship from The Prophecy, defeating Christopher Daniels and Xavier. The duo would subsequently feud with the Prophecy and the Briscoes, but Homicide subbed in for Red for a successful title defense over Daniels and Dan Maff. Amazing Phenomenon's title reign lasted 158 days, and was vacated due to Red's injury.

All Japan Pro Wrestling (2003–2004)
Through late 2003, Amazing Red wrestled as Misterio Red as well as Airwalk Spriggan, while on a tour with All Japan Pro Wrestling. During the tour, he suffered a near career-ending knee injury, tearing his anterior cruciate ligament and having to undergo surgery which kept him on the sideline for an entire year.

WWE (2005, 2012)
Red wrestled CM Punk in a dark match at a SmackDown taping on May 12, 2005. In June 2012, Red wrestled a tryout dark match for WWE.

Independent circuit (2006–2008)
Red's last appearance was at a New York Wrestling Connection event at the beginning of 2006, where he lost his match to Javi-Air and re-injured his knee.

After being on the sidelines with his injury, Red made his return on December 13, 2008, at Jersey All Pro Wrestling's Best of the Light Heavyweights, the match was won by Archadia as he defeated Flip Kendrick and Louis Lyndon.

Total Nonstop Action Wrestling (2009–2011)

In April 2009, it was announced via the TNA website that the Amazing Red would return to the company in the Team 3D Tag Team Invitational Tournament. On the April 30 episode of Impact!, he teamed with then-X Division Champion Suicide to defeat The Motor City Machine Guns (Alex Shelley and Chris Sabin).

Suicide and Amazing Red were eliminated from the tournament on the May 14 episode of Impact!, by new stable The British Invasion, after interference from Shelley and Sabin.

On the May 28 episode of Impact!, he challenged Suicide for the X Division Championship but was unsuccessful in winning the title for a second time. On August 16, at Hard Justice, Red competed in a Steel Asylum match in another losing effort. On the October 1 episode of Impact!, Red became the number one contender to Samoa Joe's X Division title by defeating Jay Lethal, Consequences Creed, Sheik Abdul Bashir and Kiyoshi in a ladder match. On the following Impact!, Red won the X Division Championship for the second time by pinning Samoa Joe following interference by Bobby Lashley. On the October 15 episode of Impact!, Don West debuted as Red's new manager. On October 18, at Bound for Glory, Red retained his X Division title in an Ultimate X match against Homicide, Daniels, Suicide, Alex Shelley and Chris Sabin. The following week on Impact!, Red lost to Homicide in a non-title match. The return match between the two was booked for Turning Point, where Red was able to retain his title. Afterwards Don West quietly broke off his affiliation with Red, while he went on to defend his title on TNA's weekly Webmatches against the likes of Chris Sabin and Homicide. At Genesis, Red retained his title in a match against the returning Brian Kendrick. On the January 28 episode of Impact!, the British Invasion attacked Red after his six-man tag team match. As Rob Terry was going to cash in his "Feast or Fired" briefcase, which gave him the right to challenge for the X Division Championship anytime, anywhere, his stable mate Doug Williams managed to convince him to hand it over to him and defeated Red to win the Championship. On the April 12 episode of Impact!, Red took the place of the injured Hernandez and teamed up with Matt Morgan to successfully defend the TNA World Tag Team Championship against the Motor City Machine Guns. After the match, Morgan attacked Red for getting the pinfall in the match. After a few weeks out of action, Red returned to Impact!, on the June 10 episode, in a losing effort against Kurt Angle. On September 23 Red defeated Jay Lethal at a live event in his hometown of New York City to win the X Division Championship for the third time. Red re-lost the title to Lethal two days later at a live event in Rahway, New Jersey. On the December 23 episode of Impact!, Red answered Jeff Jarrett's MMA Challenge, but was defeated by submission. After the match Red, told Jarrett that he had a younger brother, who would answer the challenge the following week. The following week Red's storyline brother, billed simply as Little Red (later renamed Crimson), answered the challenge and was winning his match against Jarrett, before Jarrett was pulled away from the ring by his security guards Gunner and Murphy. Shortly afterwards, Crimson broke away from Red and the relation between the two was seldom mentioned again.

On the April 19 episode of Xplosion, Figueroa debuted as Sangriento, a masked luchador, in a three-way match, where he defeated Jay Lethal and Chris Sabin. Sangriento made his Impact! debut on May 5, defeating Suicide. After defeating Suicide in a rematch the following week, Sangriento was not seen again for two months, until appearing in a backstage segment with Eric Young at Destination X on July 10. At the same pay-per-view Amazing Red wrestled in an X Division number one contender's Ultimate X match, which was won by Alex Shelley, and which would turn out to be his final match for the promotion. On August 4, 2011, Figueroa announced via his Twitter account that he had parted ways with TNA.

Return to Ring of Honor (2012)
On March 4, 2012, Red returned to Ring of Honor at the 10th Anniversary Show, where he teamed with T. J. Perkins in a losing effort against the House of Truth (Michael Elgin and Roderick Strong).

New Japan Pro-Wrestling (2019)
In August 2019, Red was announced for the New Japan Pro-Wrestling Super J Cup that takes place in late-August. He would be defeated in the first round by the IWGP Junior Heavyweight Champion Will Ospreay. He would then be booked for the September U.S. tour Fighting Spirit Unleashed.

House of Glory (2014–present)
Also, Red opened his own training school, House of Glory. During his initial stint in the company, he became one-time HOG Tag Team Champion with his former teammate Crimson after defeating the Young Bucks (Matt Jackson and Nick Jackson). He also won the HOG Heavyweight Championship at House of Glory's "High Intensity 6" and would hold the title for a record setting 364 days. He lost the title almost a year later at "High Intensity 7" to Anthony Gangone in a No Ropes Match. Red would be forced to join the House of Gangone stable, and would then, of his own choice, turn heel by attacking two of his students, Private Party (Marq Quen and Isiah Kassidy).

Professional wrestling style and persona
Red is known for his high-flying style. He has been described as a pioneer and an innovator during the early 2000s. Will Ospreay has called him an inspiration. Red is also credited for inventing the front flip piledriver, which is later known by many wrestlers as the Canadian Destroyer.

Personal life
Figueroa is married and has two children with his wife.

Championships and accomplishments

Cleveland All-Pro Wrestling
CAPW North American Junior Heavyweight Championship (1 time)
East Coast Wrestling Association
ECWA Heavyweight Championship (2 times)
Great Championship Wrestling
GCW Cruiserweight Championship (1 time)
Hardcore Wrestling Alliance
HWA Heavyweight Championship (1 time)
House of Glory
HOG Cruiserweight Championship (1 time)
HOG World Heavyweight Championship (1 time)
HOG Tag Team Championship (1 time) – with Crimson
HOG Suicidal 6 Way Championship (1 time)
Impact Championship Wrestling
ICW Heavyweight Championship (1 time)
ICW Tag Team Championship (1 time) – with Danny Demanto
Maryland Championship Wrestling
MCW Cruiserweight Championship (1 time)
New York Wrestling Connection
NYWC Interstate Championship (1 time)
New England Frontier Wrestling
NEFW Tag Team Championships (1 time) - with Brian XL
Premier Wrestling Federation
PWF Junior Heavyweight Championship (2 times)
Pro Wrestling Illustrated
PWI ranked him #87 of the top 500 singles wrestlers in the PWI 500 in 2010
Pro Wrestling Syndicate 
PWS Suicidal Six-way Championship (1 time)
 Renegade Wrestling Alliance
 RWA Cruiserweight Championship (1 time)
Ring of Honor
ROH World Tag Team Championship (1 time) – with A.J. Styles
Total Nonstop Action Wrestling
TNA X Division Championship (3 times)
NWA World Tag Team Championship (1 time) – with Jerry Lynn
United States Extreme Wrestling
USEW United States Heavyweight Championship (1 time)
United Xtreme Wrestling / USA Pro Wrestling
UXW/USA Pro United States Championship (2 times)
Unreal Championship Wrestling
UCW Heavyweight Championship (1 time)
Other titles
HWVY Junior Heavyweight Championship (1 time)

See also
Professional wrestling in Puerto Rico

References

External links

 
 House of Glory

1982 births
Living people
20th-century professional wrestlers
21st-century professional wrestlers
Puerto Rican male professional wrestlers
People from Cayey, Puerto Rico
American male professional wrestlers
Sportspeople from Brooklyn
Masked wrestlers
ROH World Tag Team Champions
TNA/Impact X Division Champions
NWA World Tag Team Champions